Loricalepis is a monotypic genus of flowering plants belonging to the family Melastomataceae. The only species is Loricalepis duckei.

Its native range is Northern Brazil.

References

Melastomataceae
Melastomataceae genera
Monotypic Myrtales genera